Escuela Mexicana del Valle (EMV)/Escuela Mexicana Americana (EMA) is a private school system in Colonia del Valle, Benito Juárez, Mexico City. It consists of seven campuses, and serves levels preschool until senior high school (preparatoria).

Escuela Mexicana Americana was first established with 35 students on October 20, 1959; Parroquia 812 was its first campus. In 1979 Escuela Mexicana del Valle was established.

References

External links
 Escuela Mexicana del Valle / Americana—

Benito Juárez, Mexico City
Private schools in Mexico
High schools in Mexico City